The 1937 Troy State Red Wave football team represented Troy State Teachers College (now known as Troy University) as a member of the Southern Intercollegiate Athletic Association (SIAA) during the 1937 college football season. Led by first-year head coach Albert Choate, the Red Wave compiled an overall record of 2–7–2, with a mark of 1–3 in conference play, and finished in 26th place in the SIAA. Choate was hired to succeed Albert Elmore as both athletic director and head football coach in May 1937.

Schedule

References

Troy State
Troy Trojans football seasons
Troy State Red Wave football